In organic chemistry, an acetal is a functional group with the connectivity . Here, the R groups can be organic fragments (a carbon atom, with arbitrary other atoms attached to that) or hydrogen, while the R' groups must be organic fragments not hydrogen. The two R' groups can be equivalent to each other (a "symmetric acetal") or not (a "mixed acetal"). Acetals are formed from and convertible to aldehydes or ketones and have the same oxidation state at the central carbon, but have substantially different chemical stability and reactivity as compared to the analogous carbonyl compounds. The central carbon atom has four bonds to it, and is therefore saturated and has tetrahedral geometry.

The term ketal is sometimes used to identify structures associated with ketones (both R groups organic fragments rather than hydrogen) rather than aldehydes and, historically, the term acetal was used specifically for the aldehyde-related cases (having at least one hydrogen in place of an R on the central carbon).  The IUPAC originally deprecated the usage of the word ketal altogether, but has since reversed its decision.  However, in contrast to historical usage, ketals are now a subset of acetals, a term that now encompasses both aldehyde- and ketone-derived structures.

If one of the R groups has an oxygen as the first atom (that is, there are more than two oxygens single-bonded to the central carbon), the functional group is instead an orthoester. In contrast to variations of R, both R' groups are organic fragments. If one R' is a hydrogen, the functional group is instead a hemiacetal, while if both are H, the functional group is a ketone hydrate or aldehyde hydrate.

Formation of an acetal occurs when the hydroxyl group of a hemiacetal becomes protonated and is lost as water. The carbocation that is produced is then rapidly attacked by a molecule of alcohol. Loss of the proton from the attached alcohol gives the acetal.

Acetals are stable compared to hemiacetals but their formation is a reversible equilibrium as with esters. As a reaction to create an acetal proceeds, water must be removed from the reaction mixture, for example, with a Dean–Stark apparatus, lest it hydrolyse the product back to the hemiacetal. The formation of acetals reduces the total number of molecules present (carbonyl + 2 alcohol → acetal + water) and therefore is generally not favourable with regards to entropy. One situation where it is not entropically unfavourable is when a single diol molecule is used rather than two separate alcohol molecules (carbonyl + diol → acetal + water). Another way to avoid the entropic cost is to perform the synthesis by acetal exchange, using a pre-existing acetal-type reagent as the OR'-group donor rather than simple addition of alcohols themselves. One type of reagent used for this method is an orthoester. In this case, water produced along with the acetal product is destroyed when it hydrolyses residual orthoester molecules, and this side reaction also produces more alcohol to be used in the main reaction.

Acetals are used as protecting groups for carbonyl groups in organic synthesis because they are stable with respect to hydrolysis by bases and with respect to many oxidizing and reducing agents. They can either protect the carbonyl in a molecule (by temporarily reacting it with an alcohol) or a diol (by temporarily reacting it with a carbonyl). That is, either the carbonyl, or the alcohols, or both could be part of the molecule whose reactivity is to be controlled.

Various specific carbonyl compounds have special names for their acetal forms. For example, an acetal formed from formaldehyde (two hydrogens attached to the central carbon) is sometimes called a formal or the methylenedioxy group. The acetal formed from acetone is sometimes called an acetonide.

Used in a more general sense, the term X,Y-acetal also refers to any functional group that consists of a carbon bearing two heteroatoms X and Y.  For example, N,O-acetal refers to compounds of type R1R2C(OR)(NR'2) (R,R' ≠ H) also known as a hemiaminal ether) and S,S-acetal refers to compounds of type R1R2C(SR)(SR') (R,R' ≠ H, also known as a thioacetal).

Acetalisation
Acetalisation is the organic reaction that involves the formation of an acetal (or ketals). One way of acetal formation is the nucleophilic addition of an alcohol to a ketone or an aldehyde. Acetalisation is often used in organic synthesis to create a protecting group because it is a reversible reaction.

Acetalisation is acid catalysed with elimination of water; acetals do not form under basic conditions. The reaction can be driven to the acetal when water is removed from the reaction system either by azeotropic distillation or trapping water with molecular sieves or aluminium oxide.

The carbonyl group in 1 takes a proton from hydronium. The protonated carbonyl group 2 is activated for nucleophilic addition of the alcohol. The structures 2a and 2b are mesomers. After deprotonation of 3 by water the hemiacetal or hemiketal 4 is formed. The hydroxyl group in 4 is protonated leading to the oxonium ion 6 which accepts a second alcohol group to 7 with a final deprotonation to the acetal 8. The reverse reaction takes place by adding water in the same acidic medium. Acetals are stable towards basic media. In a transacetalisation or crossacetalisation a diol reacts with an acetal or two different acetals react with each other. Again this is possible because all the reaction steps are equilibria.

Examples
Benzylidene acetal, a protecting group
Dimethoxymethane, a solvent, a.k.a. methylal, a.k.a. formal [ambiguous]
Dioxolane
Metaldehyde
Paraldehyde
1,3,5-Trioxane
Phenylsulfonylethylidene (PSE) acetal is an example of arylsulfonyl acetal possessing atypical properties, like resistance to acid hydrolysis which leads to selective introduction and removal of the protective group.
Most glycosidic bonds in carbohydrates and other polysaccharides are acetal linkages.
Cellulose is a ubiquitous example of a polyacetal.
Although many compounds contain an acetal functional group, at least two acetal compounds are called "acetal" for short:
Polyoxymethylene (POM) plastic, also known as "acetal" or "polyacetal", is a polyacetal (and a polyether), and a polymer of formaldehyde.
1,1-Diethoxyethane (acetaldehyde diethyl acetal), sometimes called simply "acetal", is an important flavouring compound in distilled beverages.

See also
Aminal, a.k.a. aminoacetal
Hemiaminal
Orthoformate
Thioacetal
Thioketal

References

 
Functional groups
Protecting groups